Rybnoye is a rural locality (a selo) and the administrative center of Rybinsky Selsoviet, Kamensky District, Altai Krai, Russia. The population was 783 as of 2013. There are 13 streets.

Geography 
Rybnoye is located 32 km south of Kamen-na-Obi (the district's administrative centre) by road. Samarsky is the nearest rural locality.

References 

Rural localities in Kamensky District, Altai Krai